Joseph Haydn's Symphony No. 4 in D major, Hoboken I/4, is believed to have been written between 1757 and 1761.

It is scored for 2 oboes, bassoon, 2 horns, strings and continuo. As usual for the period, it is in three movements:

Presto, 
Andante in D minor, 
Tempo di menuetto, 

The second movement features a syncopated second violin part. The walking eighth-notes of the second violins are offset by half a step (a sixteenth note) from the first violins that play above it.

The finale is marked Tempo di menuetto, but is not in the  time of a minuet, but in the  time which is typical of Haydn's other early symphonic finales. Also, unlike other minuets, the movement lacks a central trio section.

References 

Symphony 004
Compositions in D major